Jenny Hansen is an American stuntwoman and retired gymnast from Somerset, Wisconsin. Born in 1973, Hansen won three consecutive NCAA All-Around Championships between 1993 and 1995, the only person to ever win three straight All-Around titles.  She attended the University of Kentucky from 1992 until 1996 and has since been named to the UK's Athletic Hall of Fame.  Hansen won a total of eight national titles and nine Southeastern Conference championships during her collegiate career. She was a three-time winner of the Honda Sports Award in gymnastics. She is a thirteen time All-American and was named the Most Outstanding Gymnast over the past 25 years of NCAA competition in 2006.

NCAA Championships
All-Around - 1993, 1994, & 1995
Balance Beam - 1994 & 1995
Floor Exercise - 1995
Vault - 1994 & 1995

Southeastern Conference Championships
All-Around - 1993
Balance Beam - 1995 & 1996
Floor Exercise - 1994, 1995, & 1996
Uneven Bars - 1993
Vault - 1993 & 1994

Comeback
After retiring from the sport of Gymnastics, Hansen announced plans to try out for the United States women's gymnastics team for the London 2012 Olympics at the age of 38, but did not make the team.

References

External links
 University of Kentucky Gymnastics Page

American female artistic gymnasts
Living people
Year of birth missing (living people)
Kentucky Wildcats women's gymnasts
People from Somerset, Wisconsin
NCAA gymnasts who have scored a perfect 10